The International Phonetic Alphabet was created soon after the International Phonetic Association was established in the late 19th century. It was intended as an international system of phonetic transcription for oral languages, originally for pedagogical purposes. The Association was established in Paris in 1886 by French and British language teachers led by Paul Passy. The Association based their alphabet upon the Romic alphabet of Henry Sweet, which in turn was based on the Phonotypic Alphabet of Isaac Pitman and the Palæotype of Alexander John Ellis.

The alphabet has undergone a number of revisions during its history, the most significant being the one put forth at the Kiel Convention in 1989. Changes to the alphabet are proposed and discussed in the Association's organ, Journal of the International Phonetic Association, previously known as Le Maître Phonétique and before that as The Phonetic Teacher, and then put to a vote by the Association's Council.

The extensions to the IPA for disordered speech were created in 1990, with its first major revision approved in 2016.

Early alphabets
The International Phonetic Association was founded in Paris in 1886 under the name Dhi Fonètik Tîtcerz' Asóciécon (The Phonetic Teachers' Association), a development of L'Association phonétique des professeurs d'Anglais ("The English Teachers' Phonetic Association"), to promote an international phonetic alphabet, designed primarily for English, French, and German, for use in schools to facilitate acquiring foreign pronunciation.

Originally the letters had different phonetic values from language to language.

As of May and November 1887, the alphabets were as follows:

1888 alphabet
In the August–September 1888 issue of its journal, the Phonetic Teachers' Association published a standardized alphabet intended for transcription of multiple languages, reflecting its members' consensus that only one set of alphabet ought to be used for all languages, along with a set of six principles:

 There should be a separate sign for each distinctive sound; that is, for each sound which, being used instead of another, in the same language, can change the meaning of a word.
 When any sound is found in several languages, the same sign should be used in all. This applies also to very similar shades of sound.
 The alphabet should consist as much as possible of the ordinary letters of the roman alphabet; as few new letters as possible being used.
 In assigning values to the roman letters, international usage should decide.
 The new letters should be suggestive of the sounds they represent, by their resemblance to the old ones.
 Diacritic marks should be avoided, being trying for the eyes and troublesome to write.
The principles would govern all future development of the alphabet, with the exception of #5 and in some cases #2, until they were revised drastically in 1989. #6 has also been loosened, as diacritics have been admitted for limited purposes.

The devised alphabet was as follows. The letters marked with an asterisk were "provisional shapes", which were meant to be replaced "when circumstances will allow".

1900 chart
During the 1890s, the alphabet was expanded to cover sounds of Arabic and other non-European languages which did not easily fit the Latin alphabet.

Throughout the first half of the 1900s, the Association published a series of booklets outlining the specifications of the alphabet in several languages, the first being a French edition published in 1900. In the book, the chart appeared as follows:

Initially, the charts were arranged with laryngeal sounds on the left and labial ones on the right, following the convention of Alexander Melville Bell's Visible Speech. Vowels and consonants were placed in a single chart, reflecting how sounds ranged in openness from stops (top) to open vowels (bottom).

Not all letters, especially those in the fricatives row which included both fricatives in the modern sense and approximants, were self-explanatory and could only be discerned in the notes following the chart, which redefined letters using the orthographies of languages wherein the sounds they represent occur. For example:

It was noted that  may be used for "any vowel of obscure and intermediate quality found in weak syllables". A long sound was distinguished by trailing . Stress may be marked by  before the stressed syllable, as necessary, and the Swedish and Norwegian 'compound tone' (double tone) with  before the syllable.

Arabic emphatic consonants were marked by : . Consonants accompanied by a glottal stop (ejectives) were marked by : . Tense and lax vowels were distinguished by acute and grave accents: naught , not .

It was emphasized, however, that such details need not usually be repeated in transcription. The equivalent part of the 1904 English edition said:

[I]t must remain a general principle to leave out everything self-evident, and everything that can be explained once for all. This allows us to dispense almost completely with the modifiers, and with a good many other signs, except in scientific works and in introductory explanations. We write English fill and French fil the same way ; yet the English vowel is 'wide' and the French 'narrow', and the English  is formed much further back than the French. If we wanted to mark these differences, we should write English , French . But we need not do so: we know, once for all, that English short  is always , and French  always ; that English  is always  and French  always .

1904 chart
In the 1904 Aim and Principles of the International Phonetic Association, the first of its kind in English, the chart appeared as:

1912 chart
Following 1904, sets of specifications in French appeared in 1905 and 1908, with little to no changes. In 1912, the second English booklet appeared. For the first time, labial sounds were shown on the left and laryngeal ones on the right:

 was added for the Czech fricative trill,  replaced  and  replaced , following their approval in 1909. Though not included in the chart,  was mentioned as an optional letter for the labiodental nasal.  was still designated as the "provisional" letter for the alveolar tap/flap.  were defined as the Bantu sounds with "tongue position of θ, ð, combined with strong lip-rounding".  were still included though not in the chart.  was removed entirely.

 were no longer mentioned.

1921 chart
The 1921 Écriture phonétique internationale introduced new letters, some of which were never to be seen in any other booklet:

The book also mentioned letters "already commonly used in special works", some of which had long been part of the IPA but others which "have not yet been definitively adopted":

 for a single-tap r
 for the Czech fricative trill
 for a voiced 
As "suggested":
 for Circassian dental fricatives
 for fricative  of Bantu languages
Small j for palatalized consonants: 
Overlaying tilde for velarized and Arabic emphatic consonants: 
 for "dentalized palatals"
 for the near-close equivalents of 
 for the near-open vowels in English not, man

It also introduced several new suprasegmental specifications:

 for "half-accent"
 for "reinforced accent"
Medium tones, as necessary:  mid rising,  mid level,  mid falling

The click letters  were conceived by Daniel Jones. In 1960, A. C. Gimson wrote to a colleague:

Paul Passy recognized the need for letters for the various clicks in the July–August 1914 number of Le Maître Phonétique and asked for suggestions. This number, however, was the last for some years because of the war. During this interval, Professor Daniel Jones himself invented the four letters, in consultation with Paul Passy and they were all four printed in the pamphlet L'Écriture Phonétique Internationale published in 1921. The letters were thus introduced in a somewhat unusual way, without the explicit consent of the whole Council of the Association. They were, however, generally accepted from then on, and, as you say, were used by Professor Doke in 1923. I have consulted Professor Jones in this matter, and he accepts responsibility for their invention, during the period of the First World War.

 would be approved by the Council in 1928.  would be included in all subsequent booklets, but not in the single-page charts. They would be replaced with the Lepsius/Bleek letters in the 1989 Kiel revision.

The 1921 book was the first in the series to mention the word phoneme (phonème).

1925 Copenhagen Conference and 1927 revision
In April 1925, 12 linguists led by Otto Jespersen, including IPA Secretary Daniel Jones, attended a conference in Copenhagen and proposed specifications for a standardized system of phonetic notation. The proposals were largely dismissed by the members of the IPA Council. Nonetheless, the following additions recommended by the Conference were approved in 1927:

 could now indicate full length when there is no need to distinguish half and full length
, with the arm moved under the letter, for retroflex consonants
 for bilabial fricatives, replacing  ( was repurposed for the labiodental approximant)

1928 revisions
In 1928, the following letters were adopted:

 for lateral fricatives

The following letters, which had appeared in earlier editions, were repeated or formalized:

For the Swedish and Norwegian compound tones he recommended "any arbitrarily chosen mark", with the illustration  ("the spirit"). The diacritics for whispered, and for tense and lax, were no longer mentioned.

1932 chart
An updated chart appeared as a supplement to Le Maître Phonétique in 1932.

The vowels were now arranged in a right-angled trapezium as opposed to an isosceles trapezium, reflecting Daniel Jones's development of the Cardinal Vowel theory.

The accompanying notes read:

.—Palatalized consonants: , etc. Velarized or pharyngealized consonants: , etc. Ejective consonants (plosives with simultaneous glottal stop): , etc. Implosive voiced consonants: , etc.  fricative trill. (labialized , or ). (labialized ). (clicks, Zulu c, q, x). (voiceless ). (lowered varieties of ). (a variety of ).
Aspirated plosives: , etc.
.—  (full length).  (half length).  (stress, placed at the beginning of the stressed syllable).  (secondary stress).  (high level pitch);  (low level);  (high rising);  (low rising);  (high falling);  (low falling);  (rise-fall);  (fall-rise). See Écriture Phonétique Internationale, p. 9.
.—  nasality.  breath ( = breathed ).  voice ( = ).  slight aspiration following , etc.  specially close vowel ( = a very close ).  specially open vowel ( = a rather open ).  labialization ( = labialized ).  dental articulation ( = dental ).  palatalization ( = ).  tongue slightly raised.  tongue slightly lowered.  lips more rounded.  lips more spread. Central vowels  (= ),  (= ),  (= ),  (= ), .  (e.g. ) syllabic consonant.  consonantal vowel.  variety of  resembling , etc.

1938 chart

1947 chart
A new chart appeared in 1947, reflecting minor developments up to the point. They were:

 for the glottal stop, replacing 
, the compromise form approved as an alternative in 1938, replacing 
 for palatalized 
 replacing , approved in 1945
 for the Japanese syllabic nasal
 replacing , approved in 1943 while condoning the use of the latter except in the Association's official publications
 as alternatives for 

1949 Principles
The 1949 Principles of the International Phonetic Association was the last installment in the series until it was superseded by the Handbook of the IPA in 1999. It introduced some new specifications:

"to show that a nasal consonant is very short and that the intimate combination with the following plosive counts as a single sound", in parallel to use for non-syllabic vowels

None of these specifications were inherited in the subsequent charts.  was defined as an indicator of "medium stress".

 was defined as a velar click, whereas previously it had been identified as the Khoekhoe click not found in Xhosa (that is, a palatal click).

The 1949 Principles recommended this alternation of the letters but did not mention their typographic equivalency in other languages.

1951 chart
The 1951 chart added  as yet another alternative to an r-coloured , following its approval in 1950. Since its introduction in 1935, the letter was widely adopted by American linguists and the IPA had been asked to recognize it as part of the alphabet.

1979 chart
In 1979, a revised chart appeared, incorporating the developments in the alphabet which were made earlier in the decade:

 for a retroflex approximant was approved in 1973.

The following changes were approved in 1976:

 representing "centralized" rather than "central"
 for absence of audible release (omitted in the chart)
 for a bilabial click
 for breathy voice
 for a velar approximant

On the same occasion, the following letters and diacritics were removed because they had "fallen into disuse":

 for palatalization
 for 
 for Japanese moraic nasal
 for labialized 
 for r-colouring, as in 

The name of the column "Dental and alveolar" was changed to "Dental, alveolar, or post-alveolar". "Pharyngeal", "trill", "tap or flap", and "approximant" replaced "", "rolled", "flapped", and "frictionless continuants", respectively. , which were listed twice in both the fricative and frictionless continuant rows in the previous charts, now appeared as an approximant and a fricative, respectively, while the line between the rows was erased, indicating certain fricative letters may represent approximants and vice versa, with the employment of the raised and lowered diacritics if necessary. , previously defined as "voiceless ", was specified as a fricative.  remained listed twice in the fricative and approximant rows.

1989 Kiel Convention

By the 1980s, phonetic theories had developed so much since the inception of the alphabet that the framework of it had become outdated. To resolve this, at the initiative of IPA President Peter Ladefoged, approximately 120 members of the IPA gathered at a convention held in Kiel, West Germany, in August 1989, to discuss revisions of both the alphabet and the principles it is founded upon. It was at this convention that it was decided that the Handbook of the IPA  would be written and published to supersede the 1949 Principles.

In addition to the revisions of the alphabet, two workgroups were set up, one on computer coding of IPA characters and computer representation of individual languages, and the other on pathological speech and voice quality. The latter devised a set of recommendations for the transcription of disordered speech based on the IPA known as the Extensions to the International Phonetic Alphabet or extIPA, which was published in 1990 and adopted by the International Clinical Phonetics and Linguistics Association, which now maintains it, in 1994.

A drastically renewed chart of the alphabet reflecting decisions made at the convention appeared later in the year. Additions were:

Consonants
 for a voiced bilabial trill
 for a voiced palatal fricative, with  now standing only for the approximant
 for a voiced velar lateral approximant (proposed at least as far back as 1926)
 for voiced palatal and uvular implosives
 for voiceless implosives
 for epiglottal fricatives
 for a voiced epiglottal plosive
 for dental, (post)alveolar, alveolar lateral and palatal clicks, replacing  and obsolescent  (see click letter)
Diacritics
 for creaky voice
 for linguolabial, apical, and laminal
 for more and less rounded, now placed under the letter
 for mid-centralized
 for advanced and retracted tongue root
 for rhoticity
 for labialization, replacing 
 for palatalization, replacing 
 for velarization and pharyngealization
 for nasal and lateral release
 for non-syllabic, replacing , which now stands for extra-short
Suprasegmentals
, which previously stood for non-syllabic, for extra-short
 for a syllable break
 for minor (foot) and major (intonation) groups
 for linking (absence of a break)
 for global rise and fall of pitch
 for downstep and upstep

Diacritics for relative articulation placed next to, rather than below, a letter, namely , were no longer mentioned. The diacritic for no audible release  was finally mentioned in the chart.

The affricate ligatures were withdrawn.

New principles
The six principles set out in 1888 were replaced by a much longer text consisting of seven paragraphs. The first two paragraphs established the alphabet's purpose, namely to be "a set of symbols for representing all the possible sounds of the world's languages" and "representing fine distinctions of sound quality, making the IPA well suited for use in all disciplines in which the representation of speech sounds is required". The second paragraph also said, " is a shorthand way of designating the intersection of the categories voiceless, bilabial, and plosive;  is the intersection of the categories voiced, bilabial, and nasal; and so on", refining the previous, less clearly defined principle #2 with the application of the distinctive feature theory. Discouragement of diacritics was relaxed, though recommending their use be limited: "(i) For denoting length, stress and pitch. (ii) For representing minute shades of sounds. (iii) When the introduction of a single, diacritic obviates the necessity for designing a number of new symbols (as, for instance, in the representation of nasalized vowels)". The principles also adopted the recommendation of enclosing phonetic transcriptions in square brackets [ ] and phonemic ones in slashes / /, a practice that emerged in the 1940s. The principles were reprinted in the 1999 Handbook.

1993 revision
Following the 1989 revision, a number of proposals for revisions appeared in the Journal of the IPA, which were submitted to the Council of the IPA. In 1993, the Council approved the following changes:

 for the voiceless implosives were withdrawn.
The non-pulmonic consonants (ejectives and implosives) were removed from the main table and set up with the clicks in a separate section, with  acknowledged as an independent modifier for ejective (therefore allowing combinations absent in the chart).
It was noted that subdiacritics may be moved above a letter to avoid interference with a descender.
The right half of the cell for pharyngeal plosives was shaded, indicating the impossibility of a voiced pharyngeal plosive.

"Other symbols" and diacritics were slightly rearranged. The outer stroke of the letter for a bilabial click  was modified from a circle with a consistent width to the shape of uppercase O.

1996 update
However, the letter Catford had proposed for the value in 1990 was in fact  (a barred ), with an alternative being , but not .

The word "etc." was dropped from the list of contours, though the 1999 Handbook would continue to use contours that did not appear on the chart.

1999 Handbook
The 1999 Handbook of the International Phonetic Association was the first book outlining the specifications of the alphabet in 50 years, superseding the 1949 Principles of the IPA. It consisted of just over 200 pages, four times as long as the Principles. The section also included  for a voiced retroflex implosive, noting it was "not explicitly IPA approved". The book also said  "might be used" for "a secondary reduction of the lip opening accompanied by neither protrusion nor velar constriction".

21st-century developments

In 2005,  was added for the labiodental flap.

In 2011, it was proposed that  be added to represent the open central unrounded vowel, but this was declined by the Council the following year.

In 2012, the IPA chart and its subparts were released under the Creative Commons Attribution-ShareAlike 3.0 Unported License.

In 2016, three versions of a revised chart dated 2015 were released online, each with the characters rendered in a different typeface (IPA Kiel/LS Uni developed by Linguist's Software, Doulos SIL, and DejaVu Sans). No character was added or withdrawn, but some notes and the shapes of a few were slightly modified.

In 2018, another slightly modified chart in different fonts was released, this time also in TeX TIPA Roman developed by Rei Fukui, which was selected as best representing the IPA symbol set by the Association's Alphabet, Charts and Fonts committee, established the previous year.

In 2020, another set of charts was released, with the only changes being minor adjustments in the layout, and Creative Commons icons replacing the copyright sign.

Summary

Values that have been represented by different characters

Characters that have been given different values

See also
 Obsolete and nonstandard symbols in the International Phonetic Alphabet
 Americanist phonetic notation

Notes

References

Bibliography

 Reprinted in Journal of the International Phonetic Association 40 (3), December 2010, pp. 299–358, .

 Reprinted in Le Maître Phonétique 3, 6 (23), July–September 1928, .

 Reprinted in Collins, Beverly; Mees, Inger M., eds. (2003), Daniel Jones: Selected Works, Volume V: European Languages II – Russian, London: Routledge, .

Further reading

External links
 History of the International Phonetic Association
 Historical charts of the International Phonetic Alphabet

International Phonetic Alphabet
History of linguistics